Vinal G. Good (January 6, 1906 – December 23, 2000) was an American politician and lawyer from Maine. A Republican from Sebago, Maine, Good served 6 years in the Maine Legislature. He was initially elected in 1958 to the Maine House of Representatives. Re-elected in 1960, Vinal was elected Speaker of the Maine House of Representatives in January 1961 after spending the previous summer traveling the state meeting fellow house members.

Good was born in Houlton, Maine on January 6, 1906. He graduated from Colby College and Northeastern University School of Law before joining the U.S. Army's 10th Mountain Division during World War II. His unit was based in Colorado during the war. After leaving the Army, he served in the Judge Advocate General's Corps, United States Army at Fort George G. Meade in Maryland.

Leaving the military, he and his wife moved back to Maine and established the Sebago Agency in the town of Sebago, Maine.

References

1906 births
2000 deaths
People from Houlton, Maine
People from Cumberland County, Maine
Colby College alumni
Northeastern University School of Law alumni
United States Army Judge Advocate General's Corps
Speakers of the Maine House of Representatives
Republican Party members of the Maine House of Representatives
Republican Party Maine state senators
20th-century American politicians